"The Outsider" is a song from A Perfect Circle's second album, Thirteenth Step. It was the album's second single, following "Weak and Powerless", and charted on the Billboard's Hot 100, Mainstream Rock, and Modern Rock charts in 2003.

Background
It uses a 6/8 and 4/4 time signature. Two remixes of "The Outsider" were made for aMOTION. James Iha made the "Frosted Yogurt mix", which uses a much more toned-down, quiet, synthesized sound than the original. Danny Lohner's "Apocalypse Mix" is a darker, heavier version that starts as an ambient doomscape and ends in a way that resembles a music-playback program crashing. The latter version was included in the soundtrack to the movie Resident Evil: Apocalypse under the title "Resident Renholder Mix" and also in the Prison Break soundtrack under the title "Apocalypse mix". The "Resident Renholder Mix" of the song was featured in the premiere trailer for Resident Evil: Afterlife. It is also featured in the film during the Alice vs. Albert Wesker battle and the ending credits. Additionally, the song is in the video game Guitar Hero: Warriors of Rock
 and the trailer for the movie Safe. 

The lyrics to "The Outsider" at face value, are in judgment of a potentially self-destructive or suicidal individual, though Maynard clarified that the song's message was meant to be a criticism of people who do not understand the struggles of people dealing with depression, saying:

"[In] the case of "The Outsider", it's sung from the perspective of a person who doesn't understand at all what their friend is going through, what their loved one is going through, and they think that it's more like a sprained ankle; they can just kind of walk it off."

Track listing
Promo single

DVD single

Chart performance

References

External links
Music video (Director's Cut)

2003 songs
A Perfect Circle songs
Songs about suicide
Songs written by Maynard James Keenan
Songs written by Billy Howerdel